Hannah Montana Forever is the soundtrack album for the fourth and final season of the television series Hannah Montana, released on October 15, 2010 by Walt Disney Records. All eleven tracks are performed by its primary actress Miley Cyrus, and are credited to her character Hannah Montana. Recording artists Billy Ray Cyrus, Iyaz, and Sheryl Crow appear as featured vocalists. The soundtrack is primarily a pop record, which sees additional influences from teen pop, pop rock, power pop, dance-pop, and country pop musical styles.

The lead single released from the album is "Ordinary Girl" on July 8, 2010 as a digital download and later as a CD single, which charted on the Billboard Hot 100 at number 91. "Are You Ready" was released as the second single on September 3, 2010. "Gonna Get This" was released as the third single on October 5, 2010 and managed to peak at number 66 on the Billboard Hot 100. "I'm Still Good" was released as the fourth and final single, on December 10, 2010 on digital download and as a CD single.

Background and composition

The opening track "Gonna Get This", a duet with British Virgin Islander Iyaz, was written by Niclas Molinder, Joacim Persson, Johan Alkenas, and Drew Ryan Scott. Iyaz claimed he listened to Cyrus' music very often and that Hannah Montana was among his favorite television series with others from Disney Channel. "I've been watching the show for a very long time, and finally got the opportunity to do a song with Miley", he said. "Gonna Get This" was recorded in April 2010 rapidly, according to Iyaz, because of his appearance on an episode of Hannah Montana. At first, he arrived to the studio not knowing what to expect and became hesitant but in the end could not believe they "pulled it off". Iyaz described "Gonna Get This" as a track with an edge, claiming Cyrus added her usual signature style while he put an "island twist" on it. The track leaked into the Internet in July 2010, entitled "This Boy, That Girl".

Toby Gad contributed to the soundtrack by co-writing "Ordinary Girl", "Que Será", and "Are You Ready". "Are You Ready" was written by Gad, BC Jean, and Lyrica Anderson. The song was recorded for Hannah Montana 3 and leaked on the Internet in November 2008, along with tracks from Hannah Montana 3, yet, was not included in the soundtrack. A duet with Sheryl Crow, guest star on the episode "It's the End of Jake as We Know It", titled "Need a Little Love" was solely penned by Jaime Houston. "Love That Lets Go" is a duet with Cyrus' father Billy Ray Cyrus (who also portrays Miley's father, Robbie Ray Stewart, on Hannah Montana) and was composed by Adam Anders and Nikki Hassman. "I'm Still Good" and "Been Here All Along" were written by Jennie Lurie, Aris Archontis, and Chen Neeman.

According to Walt Disney Records, Hannah Montana Forever covers much musical ground, from intimate ballads to direct high-voltage pop. "Gonna Get This" is heavy on synthesizers and Caribbean-based melodies. Musically, the ballad "Ordinary Girl" is a pop song characterized by its mature vocals and percussion-driven instrumentation. Lyrically, "Ordinary Girl" attempts to convince audiences that despite the fame, she is just an everyday person. "Kiss It Goodbye" is an upbeat dance-pop, pop rock number and "I'll Always Remember You" lyrically speaks about the sentiments that occur after a wistful farewell. "Need a Little Love" is rich in pop harmonies. "Are You Ready"'s upbeat sound was inspired by club music. The ballad "Love That Lets Go" is a tribute to Cyrus' and her father's, who duets in the track, close relationship, both on screen and off. "I'm Still Good", an uptempo track with pop rock characteristics in its musical composition, and "Been Here All Along", a ballad about loving someone separated by distance, follow. The closing track on Hannah Montana Forever, "Barefoot Cinderella" was described as an explosion of pop music by Walt Disney Records.

Singles
"Ordinary Girl" was released first. It premiered on Radio Disney on July 2, 2010, and was released on July 6, 2010, to all digital outlets. On October 15, 2010, the song was released as a track. The song peaked at number ninety-one on the Billboard Hot 100. An accompanying music video for "Ordinary Girl" does not feature Cyrus and follows an adolescent female after she is gifted a digital camera by Hannah Montana (portrayed by a body double).

"Are You Ready" was released as the second single on September 3, 2010.

"Gonna Get This", featuring R&B single Iyaz was released as the third single on October 5, 2010.

"I'm Still Good" was released as the fourth and final single on August 13, 2010, and was later released as a CD  on December 10. It has failed to chart in any country. A music video of Miley Cyrus as Hannah Montana singing the song live onstage was released on August 15, 2010. The video is featured on the Hannah Montana season 4 episode "Been Here All Along".

Promotion
"Are You Ready" was the first song to premiere on Radio Disney on May 14, 2010. The song was later released as the first track from Hannah Montana Forever on July 1, 2010, exclusively through Wal-Mart's digital retailer. On September 3, 2010, "Are You Ready" was released to digital retailers in Europe. Subsequently, "I'm Still Good" and "Que Será" received premieres on Radio Disney on August 13, 2010, and on September 3, 2010, respectively. The former was given a promotional music video, taken from a performance from the episode "Been Here All Along". "Que Sera" received a music video that features a body double of Cyrus at a recording studio while images rapidly show to portray the sequence of a teenage male attempting to redeem a relationship with a teenage female. The song "Gonna Get This" premiered on Radio Disney and the video on Disney Channel on September 24, 2010. It was released as the second track from Hannah Montana Forever on October 5, 2010, exclusively by the United States iTunes Store. Hannah Montana Forever had its broadcast debut on October 16 with a rebroadcast on the two following days. The song "Wherever I Go" was added to the station after the series finale of Hannah Montana. Wherever I Go was added as the Bonus Track on the US iTunes store. A duet of the song was recorded with Emily Osment, which can be heard in the series finale episode of the show. The full version of the song had leaked and can be found online.

Critical reception

Hannah Montana Forever has received generally mixed reviews. Heather Phares of AllMusic gave the album 2.5 out of 5 stars and stated, "Hannah Montana Forever doesn't shy away from the fact that this is the end, or that Cyrus and her fans are growing up. Instead, these songs attempt to showcase the growing range of music Cyrus and her audience are listening to, but the results are all over the place... the album sounds scattered instead of versatile." She went on to criticize "Que Sera" and "Kiss It Goodbyes annoying vocals, though she praised "Ordinary Girl", "I'll Always Remember You", "Love That Lets Go", and "Been Here All Along", commenting, "Not surprisingly, the album's best songs are about farewells and embracing whatever may come next." She finished off the review by saying, "By the time the album closes with 'Barefoot Cinderella', an easygoing pop track that sounds remarkably like Cyrus' hit 'Party in the U.S.A.', Hannah Montana Forever proves that everyone involved with Hannah was ready to move on." Entertainment Weekly was more gracious, awarding the album a B+ and saying, "Miley Cyrus struck out with this summer's whiny Can't Be Tamed, but she's in finer form on Hannah Montana Forever, the soundtrack to her TV show's final season. Credit the would-be film star's relief at finally hanging up Hannah's blond wig; there's no mistaking the glee with which she sings 'I'm free as a bird' on 'Que Sera'. Even 'Love That Lets Go', an acoustic duet with her dad Billy Ray, feels more sweet than sappy." They also stated that "I'm Still Good" and "Need a Little Love" were the best songs. Common Sense Media gave the album 4 out of 5 stars, commenting "The music from the Hannah Montana Forever Soundtrack is a nice mix of pop-rock, synth beats, and sweet ballads that Hannah Montana is known for, as well as a satisfying wrap to four seasons of fun, friends, family, and music."

Commercial performance
Hannah Montana Forever debuted at no. 11 on the Billboard 200. This is an all-time low for the artist, as no previous album of new material released by Cyrus has failed to reach the top ten. It also the first album in the Hannah Montana franchise to miss the top ten since 2008's Walmart exclusive Hannah Montana Hits Remixed. First week sales for the album were projected to be around 28,000, which is over 109,000 less than the previous year's Hannah Montana 3.

Track listing

Charts and certifications

Charts

Certifications

Release history

References

2010 soundtrack albums
Albums produced by Toby Gad
Albums produced by Twin
Hannah Montana albums
Walt Disney Records soundtracks
Power pop albums by American artists